The Boxing and Wrestling Act 1981 passed in 1981 in New Zealand is an Act of Parliament. The Act replaced the Boxing and Wrestling Regulations 1958. The Act has professional wrestling and boxing in an amateur, corporate, exhibition and professional level to require a police permit for the event to take place under an approved organisation. The Act is administrated by The Department of Internal Affairs.

Interpretation 
A boxing or wrestling event requires an association (whether corporate or unincorporate) to officiate the event. Every event needs to have an approved police permit from the district police department. The police will do a small background check on all the boxers and approve or decline the boxer's participation depending on any active or past criminal charges or court hearings. Creating a new association to be allowed to officiate can be a lengthy process and requires the association to have a recommendation from the Commissioner of Police, a constitution, suitability of the rules, names and addresses of the members of the executive committee and more. The act also specifies that the permit is required when there is charge of administrated or contribution is put toward the event. It also requires money when people "...contribute money or to throw money into the ring or to otherwise deposit it in the building where the contest is held or elsewhere, or on the result of which any stake, payment, or prize depends."

Exclusions 
In the Act, it quotes "but does not include any of those forms of physical combat commonly known as the Asian martial arts". This means the Act excludes MMA Fighting, Kickboxing, Muay Thai Fighting, Bareknuckle fighting, Karate, Judo, Taekwondo and more combat sports. In recent years, Asian martial arts have become a vague loophole that promoters have used to get around the legislation, by getting boxers to take their shoes off as they compete. In 2017, a new sport was created to get around the legislation called Mod Boxing, which is essentially Muay Thai Fighting without any kicks.

Registered organisations

Arena Wrestling Alliance
Auckland Boxing Association
Australasian Wrestling and Martial Arts Association Inc
Bay of Plenty Boxing Association Inc
Boxing Canterbury Metro Association Inc
Canterbury Boxing Association
Central Auckland Boxing Association Incorporated
Central Hawkes Bay Boxing Association
Central North Island Boxing Association
East Coast Boxing Association Inc
Hawkes Bay Boxing Association 
Kirikiriroa Boxing Association
Kiwi Pro Wrestling Ltd
Manawatu Boxing Association
Masterton and Districts Boxing Association
National Wrestling Association
Nelson Boxing Association Inc
New Zealand National Boxing Federation Inc
New Zealand Olympic Wrestling Union Inc
New Zealand Professional Boxing Association
Otago Boxing Association
Pro Box NZ Association
Professional Boxing Commission New Zealand
Shamrock Boxing Association Inc
South Auckland Boxing Association
South Pacific Wrestling Association
Southland Boxing Association
Taranaki Boxing Association
Timaru Boxing Association
Waikato Amateur Boxing Association
Waikato Wrestling Association
Wellington Hutt Valley Boxing Association

Petition for change 
In December 2018, Boxing Judge Benjamin Thomas Watt created a petition to update the Boxing and Wrestling Act 1981 to include all combat sports. This petition came after the death of Kain Parsons, Lucy Brown and a serious knockout to Joel Rea which all happen within 5 months of the petition. New Zealand First politician Shane Jones pledging changes to the Boxing and Wrestling Act following an inner rival gang fight night in 2017. Unfortunately, only 49 signatures were obtained, and no further progress happened. In November 2022, Benjamin Thomas Watt created a new petition in hopes to create a combat sports authority.

References

Sports governing bodies in New Zealand
Boxing in New Zealand
Professional wrestling in New Zealand
Wrestling in New Zealand
Statutes of New Zealand
1981 in New Zealand law